{{DISPLAYTITLE:Xi1 Centauri}}

Xi1 Centauri, Latinized from ξ1 Centauri, is a solitary star in the southern constellation of Centaurus. It is visible to the naked eye with an apparent visual magnitude of +4.83. With an annual parallax shift of 14.79 mas, it is located around 221 light years from the Sun. At that distance, the apparent visual magnitude of the star is diminished by an interstellar extinction factor of 0.10 due to intervening dust. Just 17 arc minutes to the east of Xi1 Centauri lies the galaxy NGC 4945.

This is an A-type main sequence star with a stellar classification of A0 V. It is about 125 million years old with a relatively high rate of spin, having a projected rotational velocity of 185 km/s. The star has an estimated 2.4 times the mass of the Sun and about 2.7 times the Sun's radius. It is radiating 43 times the solar luminosity from its outer atmosphere at an effective temperature of 10,462 K.

References

A-type main-sequence stars
Centaurus (constellation)
Centauri, Xi1
Durchmusterung objects
0113314
063724
4933